Nanako Takeda (born 17 February 2000) is a Japanese professional footballer who plays as a forward for WE League club MyNavi Sendai.

Club career 
Takeda made her WE League debut on 17 October 2021.

References

External links 

Japanese women's footballers
Living people
2000 births
Women's association football forwards
Mynavi Vegalta Sendai Ladies players
Nadeshiko League players
WE League players
Association football people from Akita Prefecture